STT3A, catalytic subunit of the oligosaccharyltransferase complex is a protein that in humans is encoded by the STT3A gene.

Function

The protein encoded by this gene is a catalytic subunit of the N-oligosaccharyltransferase (OST) complex, which functions in the endoplasmic reticulum to transfer glycan chains to asparagine residues of target proteins. A separate complex containing a similar catalytic subunit with an overlapping function also exists. Multiple transcript variants encoding different isoforms have been found for this gene. [provided by RefSeq, Aug 2015].

See also 
Oligosaccharyltransferase

References

Further reading